The 2012 season was Dundalk's fourth successive season in the League of Ireland Premier Division following promotion in 2008. All together, it was the club's 86th season in League of Ireland football. The club was managed by Sean McCaffrey, who was in his first season in charge. The club also competed in the FAI Cup, League of Ireland Cup and the Leinster Senior Cup. Dundalk finished the 33-round season in 11th position, requiring them to play a promotion/relegation play-off against Waterford United of the First Division; a tie which they won on aggregate, thus retaining their place in the Premier Division for the 2013 season. Results against Monaghan United F.C. were expunged, after they withdrew from the League mid-season.

The club spent the season battling financial problems, which threatened to put the club of business altogether. Manager Sean McCaffrey resigned in July with the club rooted to the bottom of the table and financial losses mounting. He was replaced by his assistant, Darius Kierans, in a caretaker role. The club's owner, Gerry Matthews put the club up for sale, and with the assistance of a Supporters Trust, it was taken over by local businessmen Andy Connolly and Paul Brown (owners of the team's official sponsors, Fastfix) before the end of the season.

2012 Fixtures and results

Premier Division

Final Table

Promotion/relegation play-off

Dundalk won the play-off 4–2 on aggregate and remained in the Premier Division

FAI Cup

League of Ireland Cup

Leinster Senior Cup

References

Dundalk F.C. seasons
Dundalk